Crisitán Andrés Romero Godoy (born 26 December 1963) is a Chilean football manager and former player who played as a midfielder. He is the current manager of Universidad de Chile's youth sides.

Romero has been two times international with national team.

Managerial career
In 2004, he began his career as the assistant coach of Horacio Rivas in Palestino. Later, he has mainly worked in Universidad de Chile, both at youth and senior level. As the head coach, he has also worked for Provincial Osorno in the Primera B de Chile. In addition, he was the General Manager of Deportes Iberia between 2015 and 2017.

In 2021, he replaced Esteban Valencia as the coach of Universidad de Chile.

Honours

Player
Universidad de Chile
 Primera División de Chile (2): 1994, 1995

References

External links

1963 births
Living people
Association football midfielders
Chilean footballers
Chile international footballers
Cobreloa footballers
Deportes Melipilla footballers
Lota Schwager footballers
Everton de Viña del Mar footballers
Universidad de Chile footballers
Deportes Iquique footballers
Primera B de Chile players
Chilean Primera División players
Chilean football managers
Provincial Osorno managers
Universidad de Chile managers
Primera B de Chile managers
Chilean Primera División managers